Andrew Allen  (born 2 November 1988) is an Ulster Unionist Party (UUP) politician in Northern Ireland and a former soldier in the British Army. He served in the War in Afghanistan in 2008. He is one of the more liberal members of the party, consistently voting in favour of same-sex marriage and abortion.

Allen is the UUP spokesperson for Communities, and has been a Member of the Northern Ireland Assembly (MLA) for Belfast East since 2015.

Biography

Since September 2015, Allen has sat in the Northern Ireland Assembly as a Member of the Legislative Assembly (MLA) for Belfast East. He was co-opted to replace Michael Copeland, who had resigned his seat due to health reasons.  He has subsequently been re-elected twice, firstly in May 2016, then March 2017

He is a veteran of the War in Afghanistan, and was left a double above knee amputee and partially blind as a result of an attack by the Taliban in Helmand using an improvised explosive device.

He featured in the BAFTA winning documentary, "Wounded."  The documentary followed his journey from being injured in Afghanistan, which was caught on camera by one of his colleagues to his admission to Sellyoak Hospital in Birmingham, and his overall recovery. He is the founder of AA Veterans Support a charity setup to provide support to service personnel, veterans and their families in Northern Ireland.

He was awarded an MBE in the 2019 New Years Honour list for Service to Veterans and their families in Northern Ireland.

References

External links
Northern Ireland Assembly profile
Ulster Unionist Party profile

1988 births
Living people
Politicians from Belfast
Ulster Unionist Party MLAs
Northern Ireland MLAs 2011–2016
Northern Ireland MLAs 2016–2017
Northern Ireland MLAs 2017–2022
British Army personnel of the War in Afghanistan (2001–2021)
Royal Irish Regiment (1992) soldiers
British amputees
Irish amputees
British politicians with disabilities
Northern Ireland MLAs 2022–2027